Shandiz District is a district (bakhsh) in Torqabeh and Shandiz County, Razavi Khorasan province, Iran. At the 2006 census, its population was 21,833, in 5,838 families. The district has one city: Shandiz. The district has one rural district (dehestan): Shandiz Rural District.

References 

Districts of Razavi Khorasan Province
Torqabeh and Shandiz County